Marina Bay Suites is a condominium located in Marina Bay, Singapore. It is one of six towers of the Marina Bay Financial Centre. It was developed by Keppel Land, Cheung Kong Holdings and Hongkong Land. It consists of 108 three-bedroom units ( to ), 110 four-bedroom units ( to ), and three penthouses ( to ). It is expected to be completed on 31 July 2017.

In the early pre-dawn hours of 14 January 2014, a fire broke out on the 65th floor's service lift lobby. Two security officers' charred bodies were found in the midst of renovation material. Other residents had evacuated the building and were unharmed.

References

 

Condominiums in Singapore
Marina Bay, Singapore
Residential skyscrapers in Singapore
Apartment buildings in Singapore